HMS Vivid was a V-class submarine laid down in 1942 and launched in 1943 by Vickers Armstrong in Newcastle-upon-Tyne for the British Royal Navy. She was launched in September 1943 and, under the command of Lieutenant John Cromwell Varley DSC, served with the 10th Submarine Flotilla based at Malta during the closing stages of the Allied campaign in the Mediterranean sinking various German, Greek and Italian merchant ships off the coast of Greece.

During one of her sorties in June 1944, Vivid sank the requisitioned merchant ship SS Tanais off the coast of Crete, killing hundreds of prisoners on board, including deported Jews.

Following a refit, HMS Vivid was transferred to the 2nd Submarine Flotilla in the Far East for one patrol in June 1945. The vessel was paid off into Reserve in 1946 and scrapped at Faslane, Gare Loch in October 1950.

References

 

1943 ships
British V-class submarines
Ships built on the River Tyne
World War II submarines of the United Kingdom